Krinichnoye is a rural locality (a selo) and the administrative center of Krinichanskoye Rural Settlement, Rossoshansky District, Voronezh Oblast, Russia. The population was 606 as of 2010. There are 8 streets.

Geography 
Krinichnoye is located 43 km southeast of Rossosh (the district's administrative centre) by road. Grigoryevka is the nearest rural locality.

References 

Rural localities in Rossoshansky District